The Moroccan Women's Basketball Championship is the highest women's professional club basketball competition in Morocco.

External links
Official Website
Profile at eurobasket.com

Basketball competitions in Morocco
Women's basketball leagues in Africa
1977 establishments in Morocco
Sports leagues established in 1977
Women's sport in Morocco